The 2011–12 Guadalajara season was the 65th professional season of Mexico's top-flight football league. The season is split into two tournaments—the Torneo Apertura and the Torneo Clausura—each with identical formats and each contested by the same eighteen teams. Guadalajara began their season on July 23, 2011 against Atlante, winning 2-0. Guadalajara play their homes games on Saturdays at 7:00pm local time.

Torneo Apertura

Squad

Regular season

Apertura 2011 results

Final phase

Querétaro advanced 2–1 on  aggregate

Goalscorers

Results

Results summary

Results by round

Transfers

In

Out

Torneo Clausura

Squad

Regular season

Clausura 2012 results

Guadalajara did not qualify to the Final Phase

Goalscorers

Results

Results summary

Results by round

Copa Libertadores

Group 7

Goalscorers

References

2011–12 Primera División de México season
Mexican football clubs 2011–12 season